OMX Baltic 10 (abbreviated OMXB10) is regional stock market index which includes 10 companies from Baltic states, These 10 companies, in turn, are part of Vilnius Stock Exchange, Riga Stock Exchange and Tallinn Stock Exchange.

Companies
10 companies are as follows:

External links 
OMXB10

References

Nasdaq Nordic
Economy of Estonia
Economy of Latvia
Economy of Lithuania